Julia Iotapa or Julia Iotape (born around 45), daughter of King Antiochus IV of Commagene, was a Queen of Cetis, consort of Gaius Julius Alexander, son of Herodian prince Gaius Julius Tigranes.

Biography 

Julia Iotapa was the daughter and youngest child of King Antiochus IV of Commagene and Queen Iotapa of Commagene, client monarchs who lived under the Roman Empire. Her parents were full-blooded siblings. Iotapa's eldest brothers were princes Gaius Julius Archelaus Antiochus Epiphanes and Callinicus.

Iotapa's father Antiochus IV was an ally to the Roman Emperor Nero and various members of the Herodian Dynasty. Between 58-59, there was civil unrest and warfare that occurred in the Kingdom of Armenia. The majority of Armenians had abandoned resistance and wanted peace, which included accepting a prince to be crowned by Nero as the king of Armenia. Antiochus IV had participated in protecting Armenia with the Romans from Tiridates I of Armenia.

Tigranes from his marriage had a son called Gaius Julius Alexander. After Tigranes was crowned King in Rome, his son Alexander had married Iotapa in Rome. The marriage between Alexander and Iotapa was mostly a political alliance that occurred between the fathers of Iotapa and Alexander. After the marriage of Iotapa and Alexander occurred in Rome, Nero crowned them Queen and King of Cetis, a small region in Cilicia, that was previously ruled by her father. The Roman city in Cilicia, Elaiussa Sebaste, was made a part of their Kingdom. Iotapa and Alexander ruled Cetis from 58 until at least 72. Iotapa was still alive when the Flavian dynasty ruled the Roman Empire from 69-96. However, after that, there is no more known on Iotapa.

Little is known on the marriage and reign of Alexander and Iotapa. Iotapa and Alexander had three children: two sons Gaius Julius Agrippa, Gaius Julius Alexander Berenicianus and a daughter, Julia Iotapa.

References

Sources 
 Roman-emperors.org
 Herodes
 Josephus
 http://www2.ehw.gr/asiaminor/Forms/fLemmaBody.aspx?lemmaid=?7950
 Anthony Wagner, Pedigree and Progress, Essays in the Genealogical Interpretation of History, London, Philmore, 1975. Rutgers Alex CS4.W33.
 
 Chahin, Mark (2001). The Kingdom of Armenia. Routledge, pp. 190–191. 
 
 Chris Bennett 

1st-century Romans
2nd-century Romans
1st-century Roman women
2nd-century Roman women
Herodian dynasty
People from Roman Anatolia
Roman client rulers
40s births
Year of birth uncertain
Year of death missing
Julii
Princesses of Commagene